Faruk R. Gül is a Turkish American economist, a professor of economics at Princeton University, and a Fellow of the Econometric Society.

Gül did his undergraduate studies at Boğaziçi University, and received his Ph.D. from Princeton in 1986, where he was a student of Hugo F. Sonnenschein. He has been on the Princeton faculty since 1995.

Recently, Gül has specialized in choice theory, working with Wolfgang Pesendorfer on the revealed preference theory of temptation and self control.

To date, Gül has 69 publications, his first publication being "Foundations of Dynamic Monopoly and Coase Conjecture," published 1986 in the Journal of economic Theory.

Selected works

References

External links 
 Homepage at Princeton University

21st-century American economists
Turkish economists
Turkish emigrants to the United States
Living people
Boğaziçi University alumni
Princeton University alumni
Princeton University faculty
American academics of Turkish descent
Fellows of the Econometric Society
Year of birth missing (living people)